Basketball at the 2019 Games of the Small States of Europe was held from 28 May to 1 June 2019 in Bar.

Medal summary

Men's tournament
Five teams joined the tournament. After their victory in the 2018 FIBA European Championship for Small Countries, Malta competed in the Games for the first time since 2009. Andorra did not participate for the second time; this being their first absence since 1987; and San Marino did not enter after coming last in the previous edition, as host team.

Standings

Results
All times are local (UTC+2).

Women's basketball

References

External links
Official website

2019 Games of the Small States of Europe
2019
International basketball competitions hosted by Montenegro
Small
Sport in Bar, Montenegro